True Game is the debut and only studio album by American hip hop duo Mad CJ Mac. It was released on May 23, 1995 via Rap-A-Lot Records. Recording sessions took place at the Crack House and at Master Sounds Studios in Richmond, Virginia, at One Up Studio, at Echo Sound in Los Angeles, and at Digital Services in Houston. Production was handled by members Mad and CJ Mac, with J. Prince serving as executive producer. It features guest appearances from Poppa LQ, SexC, Tré Unique and J. Prince. The album peaked at number 41 on the US Billboard Top R&B/Hip-Hop Albums.

Along with singles, music videos were released for the songs "Come and Take a Ride" and "Powda Puff".

Track listing

Personnel
Bryaan "CJ Mac" Ross – main artist, songwriter, producer
Clement "Mad" Burnette – main artist, songwriter, producer
Clement Burnette, Sr. – electric guitar
D.J. Will – scratches (track 3)
SexC – backing vocals (tracks: 3, 4)
Kenneth "Poppa LQ" Green – featured artist, vocals & songwriter (track 4)
Chris Beasley – electric guitar (track 6)
Tré Unique – backing vocals (track 11)
James Smith – voice (track 12), executive producer
James Hoover – engineering, mixing
Mike Dean – engineering, mixing
John Moran – mastering
Jason Clark – art direction, design
Ken Hollis – photography

Chart history

References

External links

CJ Mac albums
1995 debut albums
Rap-A-Lot Records albums